Salah Ameidan (born 1982) is a Saharawi long distance runner. He grew up in El Aiun. At the age of 12, he was recruited for the Moroccan running team and sent to Rabat to train. For ten years he participated in international races under the Moroccan flag. By 1999 he was the triple cross-country champion for Morocco, had won 2nd place in the Africa Championships and was two-time Arab World Champion. In 2004 during a race in France where he participated under the Moroccan flag, he raised the Saharawi flag above his head during the last few hundred metres of the race. Immediately after that he sought political asylum in France, as this action would likely have led to imprisonment in Morocco. Ameidan was imprisoned for a short period in 2009 after participating in a demonstration in El Aiun. Since 2004 he has been competing with a French team in competitions organized by the French Sport Federations, but as a Sahrawi athlete in international competitions. In 2013 a film, called The Runner, was released about him by the Egyptian/Palestinian/British documentary film maker Saeed Taji Farouky.

References

1982 births
Living people
Runners by nationality
Moroccan male long-distance runners
People from Laayoune
Sahrawi male long-distance runners